A cutaneous receptor is the type of sensory receptor found in the skin ( the dermis or epidermis). They are a part of the somatosensory system. Cutaneous receptors include mechanoreceptors (pressure or distortion), nociceptors (pain), and thermoreceptors (temperature).

Types 
The sensory receptors in the skin are:
Mechanoreceptors
Ruffini's end organ (skin stretch)
End-bulbs of Krause (Cold)
Meissner's corpuscle (changes in texture, slow vibrations)
Pacinian corpuscle (deep pressure, fast vibrations)
Merkel's disc (sustained touch and pressure)
Free nerve endings
thermoreceptor
nociceptors
chemoreceptors

Modalities 
With the above-mentioned receptor types the skin can sense the modalities touch, pressure, vibration, temperature and pain. The modalities and their receptors are partly overlapping, and are innervated by different kinds of fiber types.

Morphology
Cutaneous receptors are at the ends of afferent neurons. works within the capsule. Ion channels are situated near these networks.

In sensory transduction, the afferent nerves transmit through a series of synapses in the central nervous system, first in the spinal cord, the ventrobasal portion of the thalamus, and then on to the somatosensory cortex.

See also
Sense
Receptor
Skin
Epithelium

References

Sensory receptors